Demetrida nigricincta is a species of ground beetle in Lebiinae subfamily. It was described by Sloane in 1910 and is endemic to Australia.

References

Beetles described in 1910
Beetles of Australia
nigricincta